The 263rd Army Air and Missile Defense Command is an air defense artillery command of the United States Army, South Carolina Army National Guard. The 263rd is one of several National Guard units with colonial roots, and is one of only nineteen Army National Guard units with campaign credit for the War of 1812. The 263rd ADA Brigade was reflagged as 263rd Army Air and Missile Defense Command during 2000.

Subordinate units
 263rd Army Air and Missile Defense Command (263rd AAMDC)
678th Air Defense Artillery Brigade (678th ADAB)

References

External links
 263rd Air Defense Artillery Regiment lineage at Sill-www.army.mil
 The Institute of Heraldry: 263rd Air Defense Artillery Brigade

263
Military units and formations established in 2000